Patel Nagar railway station is a railway station in Patel Nagar which is a residential and commercial neighborhood of West Delhi area of Delhi. Its code is PTNR. The station is part of  Delhi Suburban Railway. The station consists of 7 platforms. Trains like Ajmer Hazrat Nizamuddin Jan Shatabdi Express and Saharanpur Farukhnagar Janta Express are among the fast trains that stop here.

See also
 Hazrat Nizamuddin railway station
 New Delhi railway station
 Delhi Junction railway station
 Anand Vihar Terminal railway station
 Delhi Sarai Rohilla railway station
 Delhi Metro

References 

Railway stations in West Delhi district
Delhi railway division